Acianthera octophrys is a species of orchid plant native to Brazil.

References 

octophrys
Flora of Brazil